Rhabdura is a suborder of two-pronged bristletails in the order Diplura. There are about 5 families and more than 290 described species in Rhabdura.

Families
These five families belong to the suborder Rhabdura:
 Campodeoidea Lubbock, 1873
 Campodeidae Lubbock, 1873
 Octostigmatidae Rusek, 1982
 Procampodeidae Silvestri, 1948
 Projapygoidea Cook, 1896
 Anajapygidae Paclt, 1957
 Projapygidae Cook, 1896

References

Further reading

 

Diplura